The  Washington Redskins season was the franchise's 6th season in the National Football League (NFL) and their first in Washington, D.C.  The Boston Redskins moved to Washington after their runner-up 1936 season and became the Washington Redskins.  In 1937 they repeated as Eastern Division champions and played the NFL championship game on the road against the Chicago Bears at Wrigley Field.  The Redskins won the championship game, 28–21.

The Boston Redskins had won the Eastern Division title the previous season, but had poor attendance, prompting the owner George Preston Marshall to move south to his hometown. The Redskins selected quarterback Sammy Baugh from TCU in the first round of the 1937 NFL draft, on December 12, 1936, while still in Boston.

Draft

Preseason
In the 1937 NFL Draft, the Redskins selected Sammy Baugh with the sixth overall pick. Baugh went on to play sixteen years with the Redskins, retiring after the 1952 season; he was named to the NFL 1940s All-Decade Team and the Pro Football Hall of Fame. On September 6, 1937, the Redskins played their first Washington-area game following their move from Boston. Washington beat an American Legion All-Star team by a score of 50–0 in front of 1,000 at McCurdy Field in Frederick, Maryland.

Regular season

Schedule

Playoffs

Standings

Postseason

NFL Championship Game

Team Photo

References

External links
 Redskins on jt-sw.com

Washington Redskins seasons
National Football League championship seasons
Washington Football Team
Washington